Etaf Rum is a Palestinian American novelist. Her debut novel is A Woman is No Man (2019).

Early life and education
Etaf Rum was born and raised in Brooklyn, New York City to Palestinian parents. Her parents grew up in refugee camps in Palestine before immigrating to the United States, and her grandparents also lived out their lives in refugee camps in Palestine. Rum was raised in a traditional family and entered into an arranged marriage at a young age. She then moved to North Carolina where, at the age of 19, she gave birth to her daughter and son two years later.

While raising her children, Rum enrolled in North Carolina State University, where she earned a B.A. in English Language and Literature, a B.S. in Philosophy, and an M.A. in American and British Literature and Philosophy.

Work
Echoes of Rum's experience can be found in her debut novel, A Woman is No Man released in 2019. Frustrated by the restrictions on her life and wondering why she could not pursue the kinds of things a man could, her grandmother told her, "Because. You can't do this because you're not a man."

Rejecting that dictum, Rum pursued her education. As she told NPR's Scott Simon:

While teaching literature at a local community college, the idea of a novel first occurred to her. She realized that literature on the Arab American experience from a female perspective hardly existed and needed to be told.

Rum is working on a second book which she hopes to release in 2021.

Personal life
Rum lives in Rocky Mount, North Carolina with her children. She runs the Instagram account @booksandbeans and posts there about her favorite books each month as a Book of the Month Club Ambassador.

References

American women writers
Living people
North Carolina State University alumni
People from Rocky Mount, North Carolina
Writers from North Carolina
21st-century American women writers
1989 births